Taganrog Museum of Art was officially inaugurated in 1968, but the basis of the museum collection was formed by the end of the 19th century, when the art department of the Taganrog's city museum was established.

Renowned playwright and short-story writer Anton Chekhov played a major role in establishing the collection of his home city through his connections in St. Petersburg Academy of Arts and his friends like Mark Antokolski etc.

The most important part of the museum collection was formed in the Soviet Union time, and features two departments - Russian art before the Russian Revolution of 1917 and Soviet art.

The whole collection of art was looted from the museum during the Occupation of Taganrog in 1941–1943.

Since 1975, the museum of art is located at the former mansion of merchant Anton Handrin on Alexandrovskaya street 56.

Exhibition

Russian art before 1917
Among the paintings of this period exhibited at Taganrog Museum of Art are icons that date back to 17th and 18th centuries and paintings of the 18th and 19th centuries, including works by Fyodor Rokotov, Alexei Antropov, Orest Kiprensky, Ivan Kramskoi, Alexey Tyranov, landscapes by Silvestr Shedrin, Nikanor Chernetsov, sculptures by Pyotr Klodt and Nicolas-François Gillet. The oil paintings of Ivan Khrutskoy and Ivan Aivazovsky demonstrate the academic style of painting of that time.

The Realism (arts) of the late 19th century is represented with genre paintings and portraits by Konstantin Savitsky, Konstantin Makovsky, Henryk Siemiradzki, Nikolay Bogdanov-Belsky, Konstantin Makovsky and Vasily Maksimov, landscapes by Alexei Savrasov, Isaac Levitan and Arkhip Kuindzhi, sketches by Viktor Vasnetsov, Vasily Surikov and Vasili Vasilyevich Vereshchagin.
Works by Valentin Serov, Philip Malyavin, Abraham Arkhipov, Konstantin Korovin, Leonard Turzhansky and Nicholas Roerich illustrate the art of the end 19th/beginning of the 20th century.

Soviet art
The Soviet art is represented with paintings by several generations of Soviet artists, including Igor Grabar, Aleksandr Gerasimov, Nikolai Petrovich Krymov, Vladimir Stozharov; sculptures by Yevgeny Vuchetich, Matvey Manizer; graphic art by Vladimir Favorsky, Yuri Neprintsev and Andrei Goncharov.

Monuments from the Taganrog Old Cemetery in the inner yard
Since 1976 many sepulchral monuments that represented special value as works of art were transferred from abandoned Taganrog Old Cemetery into the museum's inner yard, saving them from destruction.

Museum Collection

References

 Энциклопедия Таганрога. — Ростов-на-Дону: Ростиздат, 2003. — 512 с — .

1968 establishments in Russia
Art museums established in 1968
Art museums and galleries in Russia
Local museums in Russia
Museums in Taganrog